Hathor 6 - Coptic Calendar - Hathor 8

The seventh day of the Coptic month of Hathor, the third month of the Coptic year. On a common year, this day corresponds to November 3, of the Julian Calendar, and November 16, of the Gregorian Calendar. This day falls in the Coptic season of Peret, the season of emergence.

Commemorations

Saints 

 The martyrdom of Saint George of Alexandria 
 The martyrdom of Saint Nehroua of Fayium 
 The martyrdom of Saint Akebsyma, Saint Itala, and Saint Joseph 
 The departure of Saint Mina, the Bishop of Timma El-Amdid

Other commemorations 

 The consecration of the Church of Saint George of Cappadocia, in the city of Lydda

References 

Days of the Coptic calendar